Dragon's Gate is a children's historical novel by Laurence Yep, published by HarperCollins in 1995. It inaugurated the Golden Mountain Chronicles below and it is the third chronicle in narrative sequence among ten published as of 2012.

Yep and Dragon's Gate won the Newbery Medal award, 1994.

Plot 
Otter, a fourteen-year-old Chinese boy growing up during the opium wars and the oppression of the Manchu dynasty. Otter wishes to travel to America, to the Land of the Golden Mountain called California. He longs to travel to California, so he can assist his uncle and father, in the doing of the Great Work, in order to take back their country, yet he decides with much disdain to remain in Three Willows to be with his mother. After accidentally killing a Manchu, Otter's life is in danger, so he was sent to America to join his father and uncle. Otter enthusiastically left for America, only to find that the reality of being a Chinese immigrant meant working in the brutal cold and other awful conditions. Otter is filled with disgust and undertakes the seemingly impossible
task of climbing the Tiger, the mountain which for so long has kept his people working in bitter conditions, ascending above the cloud layer to prevent an avalanche. Which results in the loss of his beloved Uncle. Taken aback by his loss, Otter is determined to finish what his Uncle started, even if it means withstanding the bitter cold for the rest of his life.

Golden Mountain Chronicles

The family saga follows the Young family, initially in China. Dragons of Silk (2011) spans a few generations and brings the story to the present; nine previous novels have been dated 1849 to 1995.

 The Serpent's Children, set in 1849 (1984)
 Mountain Light, 1855 (1985)
 Dragon's Gate, 1867 (1993)
 The Traitor, 1885 (2003)
 Dragonwings, 1903 (1975) 
 Dragon Road, 1939 (2007); originally The Red Warrior
 Child of the Owl, 1960 (1977)
 Sea Glass, 1970 (1979)
 Thief of Hearts, 1995 (1995)
 Dragons of Silk, 1835-2011 (2011)

Four of the ten historical novels are among Yep's five works most widely held in WorldCat libraries.

References

1995 novels